The Yankee class, Soviet designations Project 667A Navaga (navaga) and Project 667AU Nalim (burbot), was a series of nuclear-powered ballistic missile submarines built in the Soviet Union for the Soviet Navy. In total, 34 units were built: 24 in Severodvinsk for the Northern Fleet and the remaining 10 in Komsomolsk-on-Amur for the Pacific Fleet. Two Northern Fleet units were later transferred to the Pacific.  The lead boat K-137 Leninets received its honorific name on 11 April 1970, two and one half years after being commissioned.

Design
The Yankee-class nuclear submarines were the first class of Soviet ballistic missile submarines (SSBN) to have  thermonuclear firepower comparable with that of their American and British Polaris submarine counterparts. The Yankee class were quieter in the ocean than were their  predecessors, and had better streamlining that improved their underwater performance. The Yankee class were actually quite similar to the Polaris submarines of the U.S. Navy and the Royal Navy.

Operational history

The Yankee-class SSBNs served in the Soviet Navy in three oceans: the Atlantic Ocean, the Pacific Ocean, and the Arctic Ocean beginning in the 1960s. During the 1970s about three Yankee-class were continually on patrol in a so-called "patrol box" in the Atlantic Ocean just east of Bermuda and off the US Pacific coast. This forward deployment of the SSBNs was seen to balance the presence of American, British, and French nuclear weapons kept in Western Europe and on warships (including nuclear submarines) in  the surrounding Atlantic Ocean, including the Mediterranean Sea and the Eastern Atlantic.

One Yankee-class submarine, was lost on 6 October 1986 after an explosion and fire on board. This boat had been at sea near Bermuda, and she sank from loss of buoyancy because of flooding. Four of her sailors died before rescue ships arrived. At least one other boat in this class was involved in a collision with a U.S. Navy nuclear submarine.

Because of their increasing age, and as negotiated in the SALT I, START I and START II treaties that reduce nuclear armaments of the United States and the Soviet Union, all boats of Yankee class were disarmed, decommissioned and sent to the nuclear ship scrapyards.

Variants

There were eight different versions of the Yankee subs:
Yankee I (Project 667A): The baseline configuration, these were ballistic missile submarines that first saw service in 1968; 34 were built. The subs carried 16 SS-N-6 missiles, had 6 torpedo tubes, and carried 18 Type 53 torpedoes. They were the first Soviet SSBNs to carry their ballistic missiles within the hull (as opposed to the sail).

Yankee II (Project 667AM Navaga M): A single-ship class, this was a Yankee I submarine (K-140) converted to carry 12 SS-N-17 missiles, which was the Soviet Navy's first solid-fuelled SLBM. The existence of this individual prototype led to several theories about the Yankee II having a unique role in the Soviet arsenal that justified maintaining a single ship with such a unique weapon. One theory suggested that it was designed to perform an emergency satellite-launching function. Subsequently, it was proposed that the SS-N-17 may have had a retargeting capability to allow strikes on aircraft carrier battle groups.
Yankee Notch (Project 667AT Grusha): These converted subs were attack submarines and first appeared in 1983; four Yankee I boats were rebuilt to this configuration. They incorporated a "notch waisted" center section, which replaced the old ballistic missile compartment, featuring eight  torpedo tubes for up to 40 SS-N-21 missiles or additional torpedoes. The forward torpedo tubes were retained as well, with some reports suggesting that the vessels may have also been able to fire  Type 65 torpedoes. The emphasis on additional SS-N-21 missile carriage suggested a tactical role for these submarines, or as second-strike nuclear submarines. Their configuration was a combination of SALT treaty limitations (which affected SLBMs but not cruise missiles) and a typical Soviet unwillingness to completely discard any military hardware that might still have some use. While classed as SSNs (attack subs), these boats might also be considered SSGNs by virtue of their heavy missile armament.
Yankee Sidecar (Project 667M Andromeda) Also known as Yankee SSGN, this was another single-ship class (in this case K-420) converted into an SSGN. It appeared in 1983, carrying 12 SS-NX-24 nuclear-tipped cruise missiles instead of the original ballistic missiles. The SS-NX-24 was an experimental cruise missile, with a supersonic flight regime and twin nuclear warheads. It was meant as a tri-service strategic weapon, and thus would have filled a rather different role than the tactically-oriented  SSGNs of the same era. In the end, the missile was not adopted, and K-420 became a weapon system without a weapon.
Yankee SSN 16 of this type were converted from the basic Yankee I specification. Some were not completely converted, although they cannot carry ballistic missiles, so they were called Yankee SSNX. They retained only their forward torpedo tubes, with the central missile sections having been removed. Some are being scrapped.
Yankee Pod (Project 09774 Akson) The Yankee Pod (also known as the Yankee SSAN) is a converted trials submarine, K-403 Kazan, which was used for sonar equipment, with the namesake pod mounted atop the rudder (a la Victor III-class SSNs). It had other sensor systems incorporated as well, notably alongside the sail.
Yankee Stretch (Project 09774) K-411, the Yankee Stretch conversion, is a "mothership" for  mini-submarines. It is fully  in length, making it the largest of the Yankee conversions. Like the Yankee Pod, it lacked missile armament. Its mission was believed to be a combination of oceanographic research, search and rescue, and underwater intelligence-gathering.

Yankee Big Nose (Project 09780 Akson-2) is an additional modification of K-403 Kazan for trials of an acoustic system for fourth-generation Russian submarines: the Irtysh sonar system, in combination with the spherical antenna Amfora, occupies the entire nose section of the submarine. Modification of K-415 was started in 1987, but due to the end of the Cold War and lack of funds, was never completed.

General characteristics (Yankee I)

Length: 
Beam: 
Draught: 
Displacement: 7,760/11,500 tonnes surfaced/dived
Speed: 
Power plant: 2 VM-4 reactors
Hull: Low magnetic steel
Crew: 114
Compartments: 10
Armament:
6  torpedo tubes for 18 Type 53 torpedoes or mines.
16 SS-N-6 liquid-fueled ballistic missiles

Units

Popular Culture 

In Tom Clancy's 1986 techno-thriller Red Storm Rising, the entire Yankee-class of SSBNs are proposed to be taken out of service and scrapped by the Soviet Union as part of the Maskirovka I, in part to have the United States to do likewise with its own first-generation George Washington class, Ethan Allen class and Lafayette class SSBNs, and allay NATO misgivings of the USSR's intentions.

References

External links
National Geographic: Yankee class accessed March 14, 2004.
NATO Code Names for Submarines and Ships accessed March 14, 2004.
Federation of American Scientists: Yankee class accessed June 11, 2006.
Bellona Report: Project 667 A (Nalim, Navaga) – Yankee Class accessed June 11, 2006.
World Navies Today: Russian Submarines accessed June 11, 2006.
Jane's Fighting Ships of the World, 1994.

Submarine classes
 
 
Russian and Soviet navy submarine classes
Nuclear submarines of the Soviet Navy